Hanna Rosin  (born 1970) is an Israeli-born American writer. She is the editorial director for audio for New York Magazine Formerly, she was the co-host of the NPR podcast Invisibilia with Alix Spiegel. She was co-founder of DoubleX, the now closed women's site connected to the online magazine Slate, and the DoubleX (now The Waves) podcast.

Rosin has written for The Atlantic, The Washington Post, The New Yorker, GQ, New York and The New Republic. She is the author of God's Harvard (2007) and The End of Men: And the Rise of Women (2012).

Early life and education
Rosin was born in Israel; she grew up in Queens, where her father was a taxi driver. She is Jewish.    She graduated from Stuyvesant High School in 1987, where she won a number of competitions on the debate team with her debate partner David Coleman.  She attended Stanford University.

Career
Rosin is a co-founder of Slate magazine's DoubleX, a women's site. She is also a writer for The Atlantic. She has written for The Washington Post, The New Yorker, GQ and New York after beginning her career as a staff writer for The New Republic. Rosin has also appeared on The Daily Show and The Colbert Report on Comedy Central.

A character portrayed by actress Chloë Sevigny in the 2003 film Shattered Glass about Rosin's colleague at The New Republic, Stephen Glass, was loosely based on Rosin.

Rosin partly has specialized in writing about religious-political issues, in particular the influence of evangelical Christians on the 2004 U.S. presidential campaign. She is the author of God's Harvard: A Christian College on a Mission to Save America, published in September 2007. Based on a New Yorker story, the book follows several young Christians at Patrick Henry College, a new evangelical institution that teaches its students to "lead [the] nation and shape [the] culture."

In 2009, she published a controversial article in The Atlantic entitled "The Case Against Breast-Feeding," questioning whether current social pressures in favor of breastfeeding were appropriate, and whether the science in support of the practice was conclusive. In 2009 she was nominated for a National Magazine Award for "Boy's Life", a story about a young transgender girl. In 2010 she won the award for her contribution to a package of stories in New York magazine about circumcision. Her stories have also been included in anthologies of Best American Magazine Writing 2009 and Best American Crime Reporting 2009.

Rosin has published a book based on her 2010 Atlantic story, The End of Men. She gave a TED talk on the subject in 2010. In the talk, she details the emergence of women as a powerful force in the American workplace. For Rosin, this shifting economy has allowed women to use their most gendered stereotypical strengths to succeed.

On February 27, 2012, following the death of children's author Jan Berenstain, Rosin wrote an article critical of the Berenstain Bears series of books and said "good riddance" to the beloved children's author. After negative public reaction to her use of the phrase "good riddance," Rosin issued an apology.

Bibliography

 
 
 The End of Men: And the Rise of Women. New York, New York: Riverhead Books, 2012.  
 The Patriarchy Is Dead: Feminists, accept it. Slate.com (Sept. 11, 2013).

References

External links

 
 
 Rosin articles on TheAtlantic.com
 Video (with mp3 available) of discussion with Rosin and Ruth Lawrence on Bloggingheads.tv (May 10, 2009)
 

1970 births
Living people
21st-century American non-fiction writers
21st-century American women writers
American women journalists
Jewish American writers
Jewish feminists
Stanford University alumni
Stuyvesant High School alumni
Slate (magazine) people
The Atlantic (magazine) people
Writers from Queens, New York
Israeli emigrants to the United States
Journalists from New York City
21st-century American Jews